Konstal 805NM is the name of a tram, that was modernized in 2003 by the company PESA for MZK Bydgoszcz which operates trams in Bydgoszcz. Only one set of 805Na wagons was modernized. Changes regarding 805Na were both in the exterior and the equipment of the vehicle.

External links

  Technical data from the producer

Tram vehicles of Poland
PESA trams